Sri Venkateswara College of Engineering Technology (Autonomous) (SVCET) is an engineering college in R V S Nagar, Chittoor, Andhra Pradesh, India.

History
The college is an ISO 9001 – 2000 certified institution established in the year 1998. It is affiliated to Jawaharlal Nehru Technological University, Anantapur.

The institute offers UG programmes in Engineering and Technology & PG programmes. The college is located seven kilometers from Chittoor and 60 km from Tirupathi, the famous hill shrine of Lord Sri Venkateswara.

Courses offered
Under Graduate Courses

 B.Tech Civil Engineering
 B.Tech. Mechanical Engineering
 B.Tech. Electrical and Electronics Engineering
 B.Tech. Electronics and Communication Engineering
 B.Tech. Computer Science and Engineering
 B.Tech. Information Technology
 B.Tech. Computer science and systems engineering

Post Graduate Courses

 M.Tech VLSI Design
 M.Tech. CAD/CAM
 M.Tech. Computer Science and Engineering
 M.Tech. Power Electronics and Electrical Drives
 M.Tech. Embedded Systems
 M.Tech. Digital Electronics and Communication Systems
 MCA Master of Computer Applications
 MBA Master of Business Administration

Facilities
 Hostels
 Library
 Sports
 Gymnasium
 Transport

References

External links

Engineering colleges in Andhra Pradesh
Universities and colleges in Chittoor district
Chittoor
Educational institutions established in 1998
1998 establishments in Andhra Pradesh